The History of Sex is a 1999 five-part documentary series by Jim Milio, Kelly McPherson, and Melissa Jo Peltier; and narrated by Peter Coyote. It was first aired on The History Channel. It features interviews of Hugh Hefner, Dr. Ruth Westheimer, Helen Gurley Brown, and more.

Episodes
The 20th CenturyThis episode first aired on 17 September 1999. It covers birth control methods, sexually transmitted diseases, sex studies, and Sildenafil.
From Don Juan to Queen VictoriaThis episode first aired on 18 September 1999. It covers the sexual lives of Giacomo Casanova to the Marquis de Sade, the pilgrims and the Puritans; African tribal rites; and Victorian society.
The Middle AgesThis episode first aired on 19 September 1999. It covers sex from ancient Rome to the Renaissance.
The Eastern WorldThis episode first aired on 20 September 1999. It covers sexuality from Japan, India, China, and Arabia. It also discusses the origin of the Kama Sutra. There is an error in this program.  It says, "The predominant religion in Baghdad was Islam, which was founded in 1622AD by the prophet Mohammed." Islam was actually founded in 622AD.

Ancient CivilizationThis episode first aired on 21 September 1999. It covers sexuality from Mesopotamia, Rome, Egypt and Greece.

References

External links
The History of Sex Variety review
"Ancient Civilization"
The History of Sex, Part 1: Classical Greece at Allmovie
The History of Sex, Part 1: Classical Greece at The New York Times
"The Eastern World"
The History of Sex, Part 2: The Eastern World at Allmovie
The History of Sex, Part 2: The Eastern World at The New York Times
"The Middle Ages"
The History of Sex, Part 3: The Middle Ages at Allmovie
 The History of Sex, Part 3: The Middle Ages at The New York Times
"From Don Juan to Queen Victoria"
The History of Sex, Part 4: From Don Juan to Queen Victoria at Allmovie
The History of Sex, Part  4: From Don Juan to Queen Victoria at The New York Times
"The 20th Century"
The History of Sex, Part 5: The 20th Century at Allmovie
The History of Sex, Part 5: The 20th Century at The New York Times
 

Documentary films about sexuality
History (American TV channel) original programming
1990s American documentary television series
1999 American television series debuts
1999 American television series endings